Joker is a 2000 Indian Malayalam-language satirical drama film written and directed by A. K. Lohithadas and produced by Salim Sathar under the banner Aachis Films. The film stars Dileep and Manya, with actors Nishanth Sagar, Bahadoor, T. S. Raju, Mamukkoya and Bindu Panicker play the supporting roles. The film was edited by A. Sreekar Prasad and the cinematography was handled by Venugopal. The film's soundtracks all were composed by Mohan Sithara while S. P. Venkatesh scored the background music. Joker was distributed by Aachis films through Aadithya Release. The film was a blockbuster in the year and one of the best movies of Malayalam Cinema and also one of the successful movies of actor Dileep. This was the last film of the Malayalam actor Bahadoor.

The film reveals through the  story of Royal Circus, an unwealthy circus company owned by Govindan (T. S. Raju) and its surroundings as poverty and sorrows faced by the members in the circus and the love between Babu (Dileep) the Joker and Kamala (Manya) the only daughter of Govindan.

Plot
Royal Circus, owned by Govindan, is on rocks. With the help of his manager Khader, Govindan just manages to run the company, though not in a satisfactory manner. All the members of the troupe live as a family, sharing intimate bonds of love and camaraderie. Abookka, once a clown, has turned insane. As he still insists on putting up the make-up and entering the ring, he is caged, when the show goes on. Babu, the favourite of the troupe is the clown of Royal Circus. Abooka has trained him to become the perfect clown. And he has learned the perfect art of masking his sorrows behind the clown's ever laughing mask. He has been there in the troupe ever since his childhood, looking after the other children, especially Govindan's daughter Kamala. Govindan has always been saying that Babu is to be his heir and is to marry Kamala. And of course Babu, deep in his heart, has feelings of love for Kamala. The movie takes a turn when Sudheer Misra, the young son of Padmini, a former member of the troupe makes his entry into the camp. Sudheer's arrival marks the beginnings of change. He steers the company out of its crisis and gives it a new form and name as New Royal Circus.

Sudheer falls in love with Kamala instantly, but Kamala disagrees to marry him. Babu loves Kamala a lot but is ready to sacrifice Kamala for the good of the troupe and its members. Vanaja, a performer in the team was earlier betrayed by Sudheer. She decides not to let Sudheer ruin the life of Kamala and Babu. Sudheer wants to have revenge on Babu since Kamala loves him. But towards the end, Sudheer decides to forget Kamala and have Vanaja back in his life. But Vanaja unaware of this, creates an accident during the Trapeze, killing Sudheer. Babu and Kamala are united in the end.

Cast

 Dileep as Babu Ahmed, The Joker
 Manya as Kamala
 Nishanth Sagar as Sudhir Mishra
 T. S. Raju as Govindan, Circus company owner
 Mamukkoya as Khader, Circus company manager     
 Bahadoor as Abookka, a mentally ill former Joker in the circus
 Mala Aravindan as Kumarettan       
 Bindu Panicker as Susheela
 Zeenath as Jameela
 Anitha Nair as Vanaja
 Reena as Padmini
 Guinness Pakru as Dwarf Joker
 Nadirsha  
 N. L. Balakrishnan as Usthadu Ranjan Pappa
 Dhanya Menon    
 Sreehari as Shekarettan

Soundtrack

The background score was done by S. P. Venkatesh.

Awards
2001 Filmfare Awards South
Best Music Director - Malayalam - Mohan Sithara

References

External links

 MalluMovies article

2000s Malayalam-language films
Films scored by Mohan Sithara
2000s romantic musical films
Indian romantic musical films
Circus films
Films about clowns
Films with screenplays by A. K. Lohithadas
Films directed by A. K. Lohithadas